"Or All the Seas with Oysters" is a science fiction short story by American writer Avram Davidson. It first appeared in the May 1958 issue of Galaxy Science Fiction and won the Hugo Award for Best Short Story in 1958.  One of Davidson's best-known stories, it has been anthologized or collected more than a dozen times.

Plot summary
Struck by the fact that there are never enough pins yet always too many coat-hangers, a bicycle shop owner begins to speculate about the possible parallels between natural and man-made objects.

References

External links

"Or All the Seas with Oysters" at the Internet Archive
 

1958 short stories
Science fiction short stories
Hugo Award for Best Short Story winning works